There have been three Battles of Lissa:
Battle of Leuthen, 5 December 1757  Prussian army repel the Austrians
Battle of Lissa (1811), 13 March 1811 British frigates defeat a French & Venetian fleet.
Battle of Lissa (1866), 20 July 1866 Austrian fleet defeats Italian fleet during Austro-Prussian War